Rein Järlik (né Ullo Järlik (until 1937); born 8 October 1935, Tartu) is a former Estonian politician and television journalist.

He was a presenter at Eesti Televisioon and one of the leaders of the Singing Revolution.

Järlik graduated from the University of Tartu in 1959 as a physicist, then he taught physics at Puhja Gymnasium for 6 years.

From 1965 to 1990, he worked at the Eesti Televisioon station in Tartu. He was featured in the series "Surma ei otsinud keegi" and "Viiekümnendad", the latter showing life after the Second World War,  including collectivization, and Stalinist repressions in Estonia.

Along with Feliks Undusk and Hagi Šein, Järlik produced  (1988), an important reflection of the democratization, freedom of expression and of the Singing Revolution in Estonia.

Järlik participated in the foundation of the Popular Front of Estonia. He was also a member of the Congress of Estonia, the Constituent Assembly, the Estonian Supreme Soviet from 1990 to 1992, and was a member of the Riigikogu from 1992 to 1999 as a member of the Estonian Coalition Party. He voted for the Estonian restoration of Independence.

As a journalist, he has used the pseudonym Madis Udu.

Awards
 1985: Estonian SSR Journalism Award
 2001: 5th class of the Order of the White Star (received 24 February 2001)
 2006: 2nd class of the Order of the National Coat of Arms (received 23 February 2006)

References

1935 births
Living people
People from Tartu
Politicians from Tartu
Estonian journalists
Members of the Riigikogu, 1992–1995
Members of the Riigikogu, 1995–1999
University of Tartu alumni
Voters of the Estonian restoration of Independence
Recipients of the Order of the National Coat of Arms, 2nd Class
Recipients of the Order of the White Star, 5th Class
20th-century Estonian politicians